Knox County Airport  is five miles southwest of Mount Vernon, in Knox County, Ohio.

Facilities
Its one runway, 10/28, is 5,500 x 100 ft (1,676 x 30 m) asphalt.

In the year ending May 9, 2007 the airport had 20,150 aircraft operations, average 55 per day: 97% general aviation, 2% air taxi and <1% military. 52 aircraft were then based at the airport: 92% single-engine, 4% multi-engine and 4% ultralight.

References

External links 

Airports in Ohio